is a railway station in the town of Yamatsuri, Fukushima, Japan operated by East Japan Railway Company (JR East).

Lines

Station layout
The station has one side platform serving a single bi-directional track. There is no station building, but only a waiting shelter on the platform. The station is unattended.

History
Minami-Ishii Station opened on August 1, 1957. The station was absorbed into the JR East network upon the privatization of the Japanese National Railways (JNR) on April 1, 1987.

Surrounding area

Ishii Post Office

See also
 List of Railway Stations in Japan

External links

  

Stations of East Japan Railway Company
Railway stations in Fukushima Prefecture
Suigun Line
Railway stations in Japan opened in 1957
Yamatsuri, Fukushima